Unknown Island is a 1948 American adventure film directed by Jack Bernhard and starring Virginia Grey, Phillip Reed and Richard Denning. Shot in Cinecolor it was released by Film Classics and in Britain by General Film Distributors.

Plot

Adventure-seeker Ted Osborne (Phillip Reed) and his fiancée Carole (Virginia Grey) are at a cafe in Singapore, looking for a charter to an island supposedly inhabited by dinosaurs. They come across the ruthless, two fisted, alcohol-suffering Captain Tarnowski (Barton MacLane). They decide to talk, and Osborne asks if Tarnowski is willing to give them a charter in his ship to the unknown island. Initially Tarnowski refuses, but then Osborne tells that during World War II he was a pilot in the US Navy. He had flown over many remote islands, and on one he reported seeing large, moving creatures that looked like Dinosaurs. He shows Tarnowski a photo, and the captain finally agrees to take them there. Before departing, Tarnowski introduces them to John Fairbanks (Richard Denning), an old friend of his, who agrees to help them with their quest. Fairbanks and a group of friends had been shipwrecked on the island with Fairbanks being the lone survivor of attack by the dinosaurs.  As Fairbanks had been drinking incessantly to forget the events of the past since his rescue, his account of the dinosaur island was believed to be the result of alcoholism and insanity.  Since Fairbanks and Osborne's stories collaborated, Tarnowski agrees to allow his ship to be hired, but specifies that no one in the crew be told of their destination.

They sail aboard Tarnowski's ship, heading for weeks in the direction of French Polynesia, where the island is supposed to be located. During the voyage, it becomes clear that Fairbanks is obviously becoming attracted to Carole, even though she is the fiancée of Osborne.

Some of the crew realize they are headed to a dangerous island, so they mutiny and attack the officers. They lose the fight and are forced to proceed to the island.

The next morning, the ship's first mate spots the island in the distance. As they approach, he spot a Brontosaurus. With the confirmation of living dinosaurs inhabiting the island, they become cautious. They unload supplies, and a camp is set up in a forest clearing not far from shore. Whilst exploring the island, they find two Brontosaurus and a Dimetrodon. Then, as they venture out onto the flats of the island, a crewmen is killed by two Ceratosaurus. Knowing these creatures can be a threat, the crew are ordered to guard the camp at all times.

After a near fight between Fairbanks and Osborne because of Carole's safety, a Ground sloth appears near the camp. Carole screams and the men are alerted, but the sloth moves away quickly. The next morning they go back to the flats where they find many Ceratosaurus. The crewmen try to persuade them to leave, and when the first mate agrees with them, he gets into a fight with Tarnowski and is killed when one of the crewmen accidentally throws a knife into his back. The crewman is shot and killed by Tarnowski while the officers focus on driving away the dinosaurs with rifle grenades and explosive bullets. Fairbanks still tries to convince Osborne to leave the island but still he refuses. Eventually though, he feels he has observed the dinosaurs long enough and decides to leave shortly. Tarnowski, however, will not leave the island until he brings back one of the dinosaurs alive, which none of the other men think is right. He starts saying bad things about the men due to the overdose of whiskey he has been drinking.

The crewmen, knowing that the officers are not treating them well, try to steal the lifeboat and get off the island. The officers are alerted, but the crewmen are able to dodge their gunfire and escape. However, they are all killed when a giant wave topples and smashes the boat. The survivors come back to the camp and find it destroyed, because Tarnowski carelessly threw away his match. Knowing that they must soon leave the island, they gather wood and begin building a raft. While Fairbanks and Osborne are working on the raft, Carole is grabbed by Tarnowski, who plays a cruel trick on her. A Ceratosaurus arises but Tarnowski kills it with two grenades and kidnaps Carole. While Fairbanks and Osborne argue about her safety again. Tarnowski tries to convince Carole to leave the island secretly with him but she refuses, and eventually, after he says he will protect her, she doses off with him. Fairbanks meanwhile sets off in search of Carole.

While Carole and Tarnowski are waking up, a Dimetrodon appears but Carole kills it with Tarnowski's gun. Next, Tarnowski tries to kiss Carole but Fairbanks arrives. The two men fight and Tarnowski is knocked out, giving Fairbanks and Carole time to escape. The sloth reappears and kills Tarnowski. As Fairbanks and Carole reach the shores of the island, they are trapped behind a rock during a fight between the sloth and a Ceratosaurus. The sloth wins by knocking the dinosaur off a cliff and walks away. Carole and Fairbanks are shortly reunited with Osborne and another passenger, and the four break camp and leave the island on Tarnowski's boat.

Cast 
 Virginia Grey as Carole Lane
 Phillip Reed as Ted Osborne
 Richard Denning as John Fairbanks
 Barton MacLane as Captain Tarnowski
 Dick Wessel as First Mate Sanderson
 Dan White as Edwards 
 Phil Nazir as Chief Lascar
 Ray "Crash" Corrigan  as The Sloth / Ceratosaurus
 Snub Pollard as a Singapore Barfly
 Harry Wilson as Barfly

Public domain 

Unknown Island is in the public domain. The film did have copyright filed on December 1, 1948, which was renewed on April 22, 1976. However, as the film was released on October 15, 1948, and the law stated that a film must be copyrighted before release, the copyright wasn't filed on time and is, by implication, invalid.

Stock footage from Unknown Island was used in the American version of Godzilla Raids Again and in Adventure at the Center of the Earth.

References
Notes

External links

1948 adventure films
1948 films
Films about dinosaurs
Cinecolor films
American adventure films
Films scored by Raoul Kraushaar
Films set on fictional islands
Films directed by Jack Bernhard
1940s American films